The Letters may refer to:

 The Letters (2014 film), film based on the life of Mother Teresa
 The Letters (1973 film), an American made-for-television drama film
 The Letters (novel), 2008 romance novel
 The Letters of Sacco and Vanzetti, 1928 collection of letters

See also
Letter (disambiguation)
The Letter (disambiguation)